Acevedo is a surname of Portuguese origin which comes from the town of Azevedo in the Viana do Castelo District in Portugal. It means a grove of holly trees or hollywood, as the Portuguese and Spanish words for holly is acebo. The surname changed from Azevedo to Acevedo when it passed to Spain. As a consequence of colonization, it is widely spread in Latin America. There is also the Acebedo variant, whose origin resides in the Asturian municipality of Acebedo, Spain. Notable people with the surname include:
 Aníbal Santiago Acevedo (born 1971), Puerto Rican boxer
 Anthony Acevedo (1924–2018), Mexican-American engineer and U.S. soldier incarcerated in Berga concentration camp during World WarII
 Armando Acevedo Milan (born 1937), Mexican chess master
 Art Acevedo (born 1964), Cuban-American Houston chief of police
 Dariam Acevedo (born 1984), Puerto Rican female beach volleyball player
 Domingo Acevedo (born 1994), Dominican baseball relief pitcher
 Fernando Acevedo (born 1946), Peruvian track and field athlete
 Jackie Acevedo (born 1987), Mexican-American football player 
 Janier Acevedo (born 1985), Colombian cyclist
 José Acevedo (baseball) (born 1977), Dominican baseball pitcher
 José Acevedo (sprinter) (born 1986), Venezuelan sprinter
 Juan Acevedo (born 1970), Mexican baseball player
 Kirk Acevedo (born 1971), American actor
 María Candelaria Acevedo (born 1958), Chilean politician
 Mario Acevedo (born 1969), Guatemalan football forward
 Rafael Acevedo (cyclist) (born 1957), Colombian cyclist
 Raymond Acevedo (born 1971), Puerto Rican rock singer
 Sebastián Acevedo (1931–1983), Chilean self-immolator
 Sergio Acevedo (born 1956), Argentine politician

See also
 Azevedo, related Portuguese surname

Spanish-language surnames